Patrick Norris was an English professional footballer who played as an inside forward.

References

Year of birth unknown
Year of death missing
People from Broughton, Greater Manchester
English footballers
Association football forwards
Salford City F.C. players
Burnley F.C. players
Stockport County F.C. players
English Football League players